Vernon Thomas Forehand Jr. (August 19, 1947 – August 19, 2014) was an American lawyer and politician who served as a member of the Virginia House of Delegates from 1980 to 1993. He later served as a judge.

References

External links

1947 births
2014 deaths
Democratic Party members of the Virginia House of Delegates
Virginia lawyers
University of Richmond School of Law alumni